Sendhoorapandi is a 1993 Indian Tamil-language romantic action film directed by S. A. Chandrasekhar. The film stars Vijayakanth, Vijay, Gautami and Yuvarani. It revolves around Vijay (Vijay) who falls in love with Meena. But Meena's brother opposes their marriage due to rivalry between both the families. Whereas Vijay's brother Sendhoorapandi returns from jail to help him to win his love.

The film released on 24 December 1993 and performed well commercially.

Plot 

Vijay, a college student, returns to his village after finishing his studies. He meets village headman's daughter Yuvarani, both of them in love with each other. Yuvarani's brother opposes their marriage. Sendhurapandi, the elder brother of Vijay, returns from jail. The story carries a flashback of Vijaykanth where Gouthami is his love and why he was jailed. Do Vijay and Yuvarani win in their love forms the rest of the story.

Cast

Production 
After Vijay's debut film as a lead actor Naalaiya Theerpu (1992) failed at the box-office, Chandrasekhar decided to cast an established actor alongside Vijay for his next film; Vijayakanth agreed to do the film for free.

Soundtrack 
The soundtrack was composed by Deva, with lyrics written by Vaali and P. R. C. Balu. For the dubbed Telugu version Bobbili Rayudu, all lyrics were written by Rajasri.

Reception 
Malini Mannath of The Indian Express wrote it "turns out to be fairly engaging film". K. Vijiyan of New Straits Times wrote, "It is amazing Chandrasegaran went into production without a proper story. Rajarajan's cinematography is the saving grace in this movie which seems to have nothing new to say". Thulasi of Kalki panned the plot and violence but praised the cinematography and music. Ananda Vikatan gave the film a score of 30 out of 100.

References

External links 
 

1990s romantic action films
1990s Tamil-language films
1993 films
Films directed by S. A. Chandrasekhar
Films scored by Deva (composer)
Indian romantic action films